Rågø is a small uninhabited Danish island lying south Zealand. Rågø covers an area of 0.8 km2.

References 

Danish islands in the Baltic
Islands of Denmark
Geography of Lolland Municipality